Seth Ennis (born November 30, 1992) is an American country music singer. He has released one single for Arista Nashville.

History
Ennis was born in Dothan, Alabama into a military family. He calls Valdosta, Georgia home.  He played drums and piano from an early age.

After moving back from Georgia to Nashville in 2013, Ennis signed up for a Battle of the Bands contest, which he won. He also wrote Tyler Farr's 2016 single "Our Town". He signed to Arista Nashville in September 2016.

Arista released his debut single "Woke Up in Nashville", which he wrote with Blair Daly and David Hodges. The song was produced by Corey Crowder, and features Ennis playing all of the instruments himself.

In 2017, he appeared at the C2C: Country to Country festival in the UK and later supported Little Big Town on the UK leg of their The Breakers Tour.

Discography

Extended plays

Singles

Music videos

References

American country singer-songwriters
American male singer-songwriters
Arista Nashville artists
Country musicians from Georgia (U.S. state)
Living people
Country musicians from Alabama
1992 births
Singer-songwriters from Alabama